The following is a timeline of the history of the city of Roubaix, France.

Prior to 20th century

 1469 – Factory franchise granted by Charles the Bold.
 1790 – Roubaix becomes part of the Nord souveraineté.
 1793 – Population: 9,120.
 1843 –  textile mill built near the Canal de Roubaix.
 1846 - Population: 31,039.
 1848 -  remodelled.
 1866 – Population: 65,091.
 1867 –  and  created.
 1868 – Société d'émulation de Roubaix founded.
 1872 – Chamber of Commerce established.
 1876 - Population: 83,000. 
 1878 –  and Hôtel Prouvost (mansion) built.
 1880 – Hôtel Auguste-Lepoutre (mansion) built.
 1883 - National school of industrial arts founded.
 1886 – Population: 100,299.
 1888 – Gare de Roubaix (rail station) built.
 1889 – École nationale supérieure des arts et industries textiles (school) established.
 1891 – Chambre syndicale métallurgique de Roubaix established.
 1892 –  created.
 1894 –  established.
 1895 – RC Roubaix football club formed.
 1896
 Paris–Roubaix bicycle race begins.
 Population: 124,661.

20th century

 1906 - Population: 110,055. 
 1909 –  begins operating.
 1911
  built.
 Population: 122,723.
 1920 –  brewery in business.
 1928 – Excelsior AC Roubaix football club formed.
 1967 – Lille Métropole Communauté urbaine established.
 1968 – Population: 114,547.
 1969 – 1969 Tour de France cycling race departs from Roubaix.
 1982
  closes.
  created.
 1983
  founded.
  becomes mayor.
 1993
  performance space opens.
 Camaïeu (company) headquartered in Roubaix.
 1994 –  becomes mayor.
 1996
 March: Police raid house of criminal Gang de Roubaix.
 Part of city designated an "urban tax-free zone."
 1999
 Kimberly-Clark factory built.
 Population: 96,984.
 2000 – La Piscine Museum opens.

21st century

 2001 – "Politique de la ville" housing program implemented.
 2008 –  website published.
 2011 – Population: 94,186.
 2012
 Bilal Mosque built.
  becomes mayor.
 2014
 March:  held.
 Abou Bakr Mosque opens.
 Guillaume Delbar becomes mayor.
 2015
 24 November: 2015 Roubaix shootings occur.
 December: 2015 Nord-Pas-de-Calais-Picardie regional election held.
 2016 – Roubaix becomes part of the Hauts-de-France region.

See also
 
 
 
  region

Other cities in the Hauts-de-France region:
 Timeline of Amiens
 Timeline of Lille

References

This article incorporates information from the French Wikipedia.

Bibliography

in English

in French

External links

 Items related to Roubaix, various dates (via Europeana).
 Items related to Roubaix, various dates (via Digital Public Library of America).

Roubaix
roubaix
roubaix